Karl Scully (born 10 June 1978) is an Irish opera tenor.

Early life
Karl Scully was born in Limerick, Ireland. He is a graduate of the Manhattan School of Music and was a recipient of the Liberace Scholarship and the Mae Zenke Orvis Endowed Opera Scholarship.

Career
He kick-started his career in 2000 when he played the role of Count John McCormack in the cinematic film “Nora”, by Pat Murphy and Gerard Stembridge, starring  Ewan McGregor. He followed his on screen success by performing operatic roles such as:  Don Jose in “Carmen” by Bizet; The Witch in “Hansel and Gretel” by Humperdinck; MacHeath, in “Beggars Opera” and Albert, in “Albert Herring” by Benjamin Britten; King Ouf in “L'etoile” by Chabrier;  Paolino, in "Il Matrimonio Segreto" by Cimarosa; Ferrando, in “Cosi Fan Tutte” by Mozart; and Arturo in “Lucia di Lammermoor" by Gaetano Donizetti. During his time in Italy, Karl was a permanent artist in the Teatro Carlo Felice Opera House in Genoa. While there he performed solo roles alongside world-famous artists including Samuel Ramey, Robert Brubaker, and Dwayne Croft.

The Irish Tenors
Karl's was heard by two Irish Tenors, Anthony Kearns and Finbar Wright, who invited him to join the group in 2006. Soon after Karl returned to the screens to star in ‘The Irish Tenors and Friends,’ a 10 part television show.

From 2006–2011, Karl was a member of The Irish Tenors and performed with them and as a soloist in Europe and the USA.

References

External links
Official site
The Irish Tenors

21st-century Irish male opera singers
Irish tenors
Musicians from Limerick (city)
1978 births
Living people